{{DISPLAYTITLE:C16H30O}}
The molecular formula C16H30O (molar mass: 238.41 g/mol, exact mass: 238.2297 u) may refer to:

 Bombykol
 Cyclohexadecanone
 Muscone

Molecular formulas